The 1998–99 Toto Cup Artzit was the 15th season of the second tier League Cup (as a separate competition) since its introduction. This was the last season that the competition was run separately for the second tier until 2004–05.

It was held in two stages. First, the 16 Liga Artzit teams were divided into four groups. The group winners advanced to the semi-finals, which, as was the final, were held as one-legged matches.

The competition was won by Hakoah Ramat Gan, who had beaten Bnei Sakhnin 2–0 in the final.

Group stage

Group A

Group B

Group C

Group D

Elimination rounds

Semifinals
{| class="wikitable" style="text-align: center"
|-
!Home Team
!Score
!Away Team
|-

Final

See also
 1998–99 Toto Cup Leumit

External links
 Israel Cup 1998/99 RSSSF

Artzit
Toto Cup Artzit
Toto Cup Artzit